Gourmanché  (Goulmacema, Gourma, Gourmantche, Gulimancema, Gulmancema, Gurma, Gourmanchéma) is the language of the Gurma people. It is the largest by number of speakers of the Gurma subgroup of the Oti-Volta languages, which includes among others the Moba language and the Konkomba language. It is the major language of the easternmost parts of Burkina Faso, around the traditional Gurma capital Fada N'Gourma; it is also spoken in neighbouring parts of northern Togo, Benin, Niger, Ghana and Nigeria.

Writing system

Grammar
Like all its close relations and neighbours, Gourmanché is a tone language; it distinguishes high, mid, and low tones. In the standard orthography the symbols c j represent palatal stops; they sound somewhat similar to English "ch" and "j" respectively.

Gourmanché preserves most of the noun-class based grammatical gender system characteristic of the Niger-Congo family, with eight classes and regular agreement of pronouns, adjectives and numerals. As with other Gur languages, the noun classes are marked by suffixes (not prefixes, as in Bantu); the suffixes come in singular/plural pairs for count nouns, e.g. tibu "tree", tiidi "trees" and are unpaired for mass nouns, e.g. ñima "water", soama "blood", gulimancema "Gourmanché language."

Gourmanché has sometimes been said to have noun prefixes as well as suffixes, agreeing in class. However, these "prefixes" are in fact proclitic particles with an article-like function. They are written as separate words in the standard orthography: bu tibu "a/the tree", i tiidi "(the) trees", mi ñima "(the) water", and they are omitted, for example, when the noun is preceded by a possessor or followed by kuli "each"; thus u nuu, "hand", ki biga "child", o joa "man" but e.g o joa muubi o biga nuu "the man holds his child's hand"; o nilo "a person" but nilo kuli "each person." 

Gourmanché verbs do not agree with subjects or inflect for tense but as with almost all Oti-Volta languages, they inflect for aspect (perfective vs imperfective.) The system is complex and unpredictable, with imperfective forms differing from perfective by the addition or dropping of several different suffixes, and/or tone changes.

The language is SVO. Possessors precede their heads. Gourmanché shares with other Oti-Volta languages the characteristic that adjectives regularly compound with their head nouns; the noun precedes as a bare stem, followed by the adjective, which carries the noun class suffix appropriate to the gender and number of the head: yankpaalo "shepherd", yankpaaŋamo "good shepherd."

Lexicography
There is a fairly full Gourmanché-French dictionary but no readily accessible complete grammar.

Literature
There is a complete Bible translation.

Animal names
Gulmancéma frog names and their Mooré and English equivalents (nearly all of the frogs species are consumed as food):

References

Languages of Burkina Faso
Languages of Benin
Languages of Niger
Languages of Togo
Gurma languages